"Attracted to the Animal" is a single by British AOR band Romeo's Daughter, released in 1993. Taken from the band's second album, Delectable, it was their final release until Rapture (2012).

The single was released in the UK only and included two additional tracks "Sugar Daddy" and "Talk Dirty to Me". The latter track was not included on the album and remained exclusive to the single.

A music video was released to promote the single.

Track listing 
 "Attracted to the Animal"  3:30
 "Sugar Daddy" - 2:26 - (Joiner/Matty)
 "Talk Dirty to Me" - 3:12 -(Joiner/Matty/Mitman)

Personnel
 Leigh Matty - lead and backing vocals
 Craig Joiner - guitars, backing vocals
 Anthony Mitman - keyboards, backing vocals
 Ed Poole - bass
 Andy Wells - drums, backing vocals
 Producer - Romeo's Daughter, Andy Reilly
 Mixing - Steve Brown, Owen Davies
 Assistance - Steve Musters, Ian Wilkinson

References

Romeo's Daughter songs
1993 singles
1993 songs